The men's 800 metres at the 2005 World Championships in Athletics was held on August 11, 12 and 14 at the Helsinki Olympic Stadium.

Belal Mansoor Ali took the field through the first 400 in 52.48.  Kicker Yuriy Borzakovskiy went to the back of the pack, but uncharacteristically moved to the front near the end of the first lap.  But the entire field was jostling for position, with Wilfred Bungei elbowing his way to the lead and the entire field scrambling for position, and suddenly Borzakovskiy found himself in seventh place again after expending the effort to get a better position.  Djabir Saïd-Guerni led the chase through the final turn, with William Yiampoy on his heels.  Through the turn, Rashid Ramzi went around the outside, passing Saïd-Guerni as they hit the home stretch.  Saïd-Guerni faded allowing Yiampoy to pass him on the inside.  Further back Borzakovskiy was dealing with traffic of Mehdi Baala and Ali still in sixth place coming off the final turn.  Ramzi easily sprinted past Bungei and on to victory.  Bungei was struggling to hold on to second with Yiampoy sneaking through, again on the inside.  Borzakovskiy's late rush caught everybody else, passing Yiampoy just before the line but was too late to catch Ramzi.   Three years later Ramzi was disqualified from the Olympics on a doping violation, but to date has been allowed to keep his previous medals.

Medalists

Results
All times shown are in seconds.

Heats
August 11, 2005

Heat 1
 Rashid Ramzi 1:46.17 Q
 James McIlroy 1:46.44 Q
 Mbulaeni Mulaudzi 1:46.85 Q
 René Herms 1:47.07 q
 Berhanu Alemu 1:47.37 q (SB)
 Osmar Barbosa dos Santos 1:47.74
 Lee Jae-hoon 1:47.90 (SB)
 Tom Omey 1:49.62
 Ismail Ahmed Ismail DNS

Heat 2
 Mehdi Baala 1:46.57 Q
 Wilfred Bungei 1:46.71 Q
 Khadevis Robinson 1:46.74 Q
 Dmitriy Bogdanov 1:46.88 q
 Paweł Czapiewski 1:46.93 q
 Mohammad Al-Azemi 1:47.05 q (SB)
 Moise Joseph 1:48.29
 Yeimer López 1:52.24
 Geramias da Silva DSQ

Heat 3
 Yuriy Borzakovskiy 1:50.14 Q
 William Yiampoy 1:50.14 Q
 Djabir Saïd-Guerni 1:50.16 Q
 Jason Stewart 1:50.35
 Dmitrijs Milkevics 1:50.44
 Fabiano Peçanha 1:50.89
 Paskar Owor 1:51.72 (SB)
 Rodrigo Trinidad 1:55.43
 Samwel Mwera DSQ

Heat 4
 Yusuf Saad Kamel 1:47.65 Q
 David Krummenacker 1:47.82 Q
 Mouhssin Chehibi 1:48.17 Q
 Alfred Kirwa Yego 1:48.72
 Arnoud Okken 1:48.95
 Fadrique Iglesias 1:49.57
 Onalenna Baloyi 1:50.18
 Manuel Olmedo DNF

Heat 5
 Antonio Manuel Reina 1:47.14 Q
 Gary Reed 1:47.23 Q
 Amine Laalou 1:47.62 Q
 André Bucher 1:47.97
 Maurizio Bobbato 1:48.36
 Juha Kukkamo 1:48.69
 Sherridan Kirk 1:48.77
 Prince Mumba 1:49.10

Heat 6
 Belal Mansoor Ali 1:47.16 Q
 Sajad Moradi 1:47.18 Q
 Mohammed Al-Salhi 1:47.27 Q
 Eugenio Barrios 1:47.53 q
 Achraf Tadili 1:48.42
 Rizak Dirshe 1:48.43
 Kevin Hicks 1:50.00
 Majed Saeed Sultan DSQ

Semifinals
August 12, 2005

Heat 1
 Yuriy Borzakovskiy 1:44.26 Q
 Rashid Ramzi 1:44.30 Q (PB)
 William Yiampoy 1:44.51 q (SB)
 Djabir Saïd-Guerni 1:44.80 q (SB)
 Amine Laalou 1:45.05
 Mohammad Al-Azemi 1:48.02
 Eugenio Barrios 1:48.76
 Khadevis Robinson 1:49.13

Heat 2
 Belal Mansoor Ali 1:45.45 Q
 Mehdi Baala 1:45.50 Q
 Mbulaeni Mulaudzi 1:45.73
 Paweł Czapiewski 1:46.33
 Dmitriy Bogdanov 1:46.83
 Antonio Manuel Reina 1:46.89
 Berhanu Alemu 1:47.66
 Mohammed Al-Salhi 1:47.97

Heat 3
 Gary Reed 1:44.33 Q (NR)
 Wilfred Bungei 1:44.41 Q
 Yusuf Saad Kamel 1:44.90
 René Herms 1:45.21
 Mouhssin Chehibi 1:45.82
 Sajad Moradi 1:45.88 (NR)
 James McIlroy 1:45.91 (SB)
 David Krummenacker 1:46.76

Final
August 14, 2005

 Rashid Ramzi 1:44.24 (PB)
 Yuriy Borzakovskiy 1:44.51
 William Yiampoy 1:44.55
 Wilfred Bungei 1:44.98
 Djabir Saïd-Guerni 1:45.31
 Mehdi Baala 1:45.32
 Belal Mansoor Ali 1:45.55
 Gary Reed 1:46.20

External links
Official results - IAAF.org

800 metres
800 metres at the World Athletics Championships